The Clerk of the Ordnance was a subordinate of the Master-General of the Ordnance and a member of the Board of Ordnance from its constitution in 1597. He was responsible for the correspondence and for the financial bookkeeping of the Board. The office was abolished in 1857.

Clerks of the Ordnance (pre-Restoration)
28 February 1554: John Rogers
9 February 1560: William Painter
21 June 1595: Sir Stephen Riddlesden (d. 1607)
18 July 1603: John Riddlesden (joint)
12 June 1623: Francis Morrice
30 September 1635: Edward Sherburne (Senior)
December 1641:  Edward Sherburne (junior)

Clerks of the Ordnance (Parliamentary)
bef. 1643: John White
1656: Lewis Audley
bef. 1660: Thomas Nicholls

Clerks of the Ordnance (post-Restoration)
1660: Edward Sherburne
bef. 7 August 1689: John Swaddell
26 March 1690: Sir Thomas Littleton, 3rd Baronet
15 May 1696: Christopher Musgrave
2 December 1714: Edward Ashe
19 March 1718: Thomas White
31 May 1733: Leonard Smelt
19 December 1740: William Rawlinson Earle
8 December 1772: Sir Charles Cocks, 1st Baronet
13 May 1782: Gibbs Crawfurd
20 May 1783: Humphrey Minchin
1 March 1784: Gibbs Crawfurd
11 February 1794: John Sargent
30 June 1802: William Wellesley-Pole
22 February 1806: John Calcraft
7 April 1807: William Wellesley-Pole
29 July 1807: Cropley Ashley-Cooper
14 June 1811: Robert Ward
29 April 1823: Sir Henry Hardinge
18 May 1827: Sir George Clerk, 6th Baronet
4 September 1828: Spencer Perceval
13 December 1830: Charles Tennyson
16 February 1832: Thomas Francis Kennedy
4 December 1832: William Leader Maberly
30 June 1834: Sir Andrew Leith Hay
30 December 1834: Sir Edward William Campbell Rich Owen
25 April 1835: Sir Andrew Leith Hay
28 March 1838: James Whitley Deans Dundas
28 June 1841: George Anson
13 September 1841: Henry George Boldero
14 August 1845: Lord Arthur Lennox
14 July 1846: George Anson
4 March 1852: Francis Plunkett Dunne
15 January 1853: William Monsell

References
http://www.history.ac.uk/office/ordnance.html

Military history of the United Kingdom
Ordnance
Senior appointments of the British Army
War Office